RSG Radio is a Bosnian commercial radio station, broadcasting from Sarajevo.

History and programming
Radio Stari Grad was founded on 23 January 1993 and it was conceived as a radio service for Old Town area of Sarajevo (During the Siege of Sarajevo).

Responsible way of doing business and fair relationship with listeners, have greatly contributed to the extremely positive image, which RSG enjoyed in professional media circles, and the general public. Motivated and creative employees, loyal audience, the wealth of programs, build infrastructure, strong marketing and exceptional social status, benefits are where RSG Radio bases its ambitious plans.

RSG Radio is part of the informal media group in the radio market of Bosnia and Herzegovina called RSG Group.

The station focuses on contemporary pop music, popular game shows and national news. RSG also has traffic service where listeners can find more information by calling the toll-free call center (0800 510 10). Latest national news broadcast on the full hour, while the Sarajevo city news are broadcast every half-hour. Media servis produces all the news for RSG and Antenna Sarajevo. The program is also broadcast via web and satellite (Eutelsat W2, 16 degrees E, frequency 11262, symbol rate 30000, FEC 2/3)

RSG Group

Frequencies
The program is currently broadcast at 4 frequencies in 11 Bosnian cities:

 Sarajevo 
 Banja Luka 
 Zenica 
 Tuzla 
 Mostar 
 Doboj 
 Bihać 
 Brčko 
 Travnik 
 Goražde 
 Trebinje 
 Čapljina 
 Neum 
 Mostar 
 Drežnica 
 Višegrad 
 Konjic 
 Travnik 
 Bugojno 
 Fojnica

References

External links 
 Official website RSG Radio
 Official website Antena Sarajevo
 Communications Regulatory Agency of Bosnia and Herzegovina
 RSG in Facebook
 RSG in Twitter

See also 
List of radio stations in Bosnia and Herzegovina

Sarajevo
Radio stations established in 1993
Mass media in Sarajevo